Artyom Andreyevich "Artemis" Chubarov (born December 13, 1979) is a Russian former professional ice hockey player. He last played with HC Dynamo Moscow of the Kontinental Hockey League (KHL). He also played for the Vancouver Canucks of the National Hockey League (NHL) and for their minor league affiliates in both the International Hockey League and American Hockey League.

Playing career
Artyom Chubarov was selected 31st overall in the 1998 NHL Entry Draft. He was the 2nd selection for the Vancouver Canucks. Prior to this, he spent four years playing in Russian ice hockey leagues, including the Torpedo organization in Nizhny Novgorod and HC Dynamo Moscow. Chubarov would spend one final season with Dynamo, which was highlighted by playing for the gold-medal-winning Russian team at the 1999 World Junior Championships in Winnipeg. Chubarov scored the winning goal in overtime of the final game against Canadian goaltender Roberto Luongo in the final game to give his team a 3–2 victory.

He then joined the Canucks for most of the 1999–2000 season, spending the rest with Syracuse of the AHL. He missed most of the 2000–01 season, playing only one game, after a shoulder injury while with Kansas City of the IHL.

Between the 1999–2000 and 2001–02 seasons, Chubarov would switch from the Canucks to their farm teams, playing for Syracuse, Kansas City, and Manitoba. He set a new NHL record by becoming the first player in NHL history to begin his career with four consecutive game-winning goals.

By the 2002–03 season, he finally earned a permanent spot with the Canucks as a faceoff specialist and defensive centre, helping them to the playoffs in both 2002–03 and 2003-2004.

With the 2004–05 NHL lockout, Chubarov joined his former team Dynamo Moscow. At the end of the lockout, it was reported he had refused to rejoin the Canucks, instead choosing to play in Russia. On August 22, 2005, he was signed by Avangard Omsk of the Super League, leaving Dynamo.

Chubarov joined Torpedo Nizhny Novgorod of the newly formed KHL to start the 2008–09 season.

International play

Chubarov won the gold medal with Russia at the 1999 World Junior Ice Hockey Championships, scoring the tournament-winning goal in overtime. He later took part in 2004 World Cup of Hockey.

Records
 First player in NHL history to begin his career with four consecutive game-winning goals.

Career statistics

Regular season and playoffs

International

All statistics taken from eliteprospects.com

References

External links
 

1979 births
Avangard Omsk players
HC Dynamo Moscow players
Kansas City Blades players
Living people
Manitoba Moose players
Sportspeople from Nizhny Novgorod
Russian ice hockey centres
Syracuse Crunch players
Torpedo Nizhny Novgorod players
Vancouver Canucks draft picks
Vancouver Canucks players